Acetylmorphine may refer to:

 3-Monoacetylmorphine (3-acetylmorphine), an inactive metabolite of heroin
 6-Monoacetylmorphine (6-acetylmorphine), an active metabolite of heroin